Mignéville is a commune in the Meurthe-et-Moselle department in northeastern France.

Population 
The commune's population has gone up and down in recent years. In 2008, it had a population of 178. Five years later in 2013, its population grew to 189, before falling to 175 in 2019.

See also
Communes of the Meurthe-et-Moselle department

References

Communes of Meurthe-et-Moselle